Saint-Philippe is an unincorporated community in Westmorland County, New Brunswick. It is part of Greater Moncton.

History

See also
List of communities in New Brunswick

Bordering communities

References

Communities in Westmorland County, New Brunswick
Communities in Greater Moncton